Rădăuți County was one of the historic counties of Bukovina, Romania. The county seat was Rădăuți.

History
Following the Union of Bukovina with Romania decided by the General Congress of Bukovina on 15/28 November 191, the Rădăuți County was created on 18 December 1918 by the Decree No. 3715 for the administration of Bukovina. 

In 1925, according to the Law of Administrative Unification of 14 June 1925, the territory of the county was enlarged in the east with the former Siret County and in northwest with parts of the former Vijnița County. 

In 1938, the county was abolished and incorporated into the newly formed Ținutul Suceava. 

In 1940, following the Molotov–Ribbentrop Pact and the Soviet ultimatum on 26 June 1940, Northern Bukovina (including the north and northwestern parts of the Rădăuți County) was occupied by the Soviet Union and incorporated into the USSR (Chernivtsi Oblast, Ukrainian SSR). Rădăuți County (with its reduced territory) was re-established in September 1940 (after the fall of Carol II's regime) and completely re-instated (as part of the Bukovina Governorate) after Northern Bukovina was recovered by Romania in July 1941, following the invasion of the Soviet Union. Nevertheless, in August 1944 the Northern Bukovina was taken over again by the Soviet Army and the borders as of 1 January 1941 were confirmed by the 1947 Paris Peace Treaties. 

Rădăuți County was ultimately abolished in 1950 by the Communist regime.

Geography
Rădăuți County covered 2,360 km2 and was located in Bukovina. The territory that comprised Rădăuți County is now included in Suceava County, while its northwestern part now belongs to Ukraine. In the interwar period, the county neighbored Storojineț County to the north, Dorohoi County to the east, Suceava and Câmpulung to the south, Maramureș County to the southwest, and Poland (Stanisławów Voivodeship) to the west and northwest.

Administrative organization

Administratively, Rădăuți County was divided into three districts (plăși):
Plasa Putila, with headquarters at Seletin.
Plasa Siret, with headquarters at Siret.
Plasa Ștefan Vodă, with headquarters at Rădăuți.

Population
According to the Romanian census of 1930 the population of Rădăuți County was 160,778, of which 55.4% were ethnic Romanians, 11.1% Germans, 8.7% Ukrainians, 7.6% Hutsuls, 7.2% Jews, 6.4% Hungarians, 1.4% Poles, as well as other minorities. Classified by religion: 70.6% were Eastern Orthodox, 16.2% Roman Catholic, 7.2% Jewish, 2.6% Lutheran, 1.3% Greek Catholic, as well as other minorities.

Urban population
In 1930 the urban population of Rădăuți County was 26,693 (the city of Rădăuţi had 16,788 inhabitants, and Siret had 9,905), which included 38.3% Romanians, 28.9% Jews, 23.5% Germans, 4.7% Ukrainians, 1.8% of Poles, as well as other minorities, by ethnicity. The religious mix of the urban population was 41.3% Eastern Orthodox, 29.1% Jewish, 23.6% Roman Catholic, 3.4% Greek Catholic, 2.2% Lutheran, as well as other minorities.

Gallery

References

External links

  Rădăuți County on memoria.ro

Former counties of Romania
Bukovina
1925 establishments in Romania
1938 disestablishments in Romania
States and territories disestablished in 1938
States and territories established in 1925
1940 establishments in Romania
1950 disestablishments in Romania
States and territories established in 1940
States and territories disestablished in 1950